Several sports clubs are named Flamurtari. Almost all of them are association football clubs.

 Flamurtari Vlorë, based in Vlorë, Albania
 Flamurtari Vlorë Futsal, a futsal club
 PBC Flamurtari, a basketball club
 KF Flamurtari, based in Prishtina, Kosovo
 FK Flamurtari Debresh, based in Debresh, Macedonia
 KF Flamurtari Ladorisht, based in Ladorisht, Macedonia